Alexandrovka is a rural locality (a village) in Kalininsky Selsoviet, Bizhbulyaksky District, Bashkortostan, Russia. The population was 25 as of 2010. There is 1 street.

Geography 
Alexandrovka is located 24 km north of Bizhbulyak (the district's administrative centre) by road. Petrovka is the nearest rural locality.

References 

Rural localities in Bizhbulyaksky District